This is the outline of the geography of the city of Ottawa, the capital of Canada. Ottawa's current borders were formed in 2001, when the former city of Ottawa amalgamated with the ten other municipalities within the former Regional Municipality of Ottawa–Carleton. Ottawa is now a single-tiered census division, home to 1,017,449 people.

The city centre is located at the confluence of the Ottawa and Rideau Rivers. The Ottawa River forms the entire northern boundary of the city which it shares with the province of Quebec's municipalities of Pontiac and Gatineau. The northern boundary begins in the west at Arnprior and continues east to Rockland.  The boundary then turns south in a straight line, separating the former Township of Cumberland (now in Ottawa) and the City of Clarence-Rockland. It then turns west in another straight line separating the former Township of Cumberland with the municipalities of The Nation and Russell. It then turns south separating Russell from the former Township of Osgoode (now in Ottawa). That boundary runs south in a straight line, then turns west separating Osgoode from the municipality of North Dundas. That boundary runs west in a straight line before turning north separating Osgoode from the municipality of North Grenville. This is another straight line, running north until the Rideau River near Kemptville. The boundary follows the river upstream until almost reaching Merrickville. The boundary then runs in a northwest direction in a straight line with a number of jogs. It separates the municipalities of Montague, Beckwith and Mississippi Mills from the former townships of Marlborough, Goulbourn, Huntley and Fitzroy.

Topography

Highest points by ward

Geology

Many features of geologic interest are found in Ottawa.

Climate

Classification

Recent data

Notes

Historical data

Rivers and creeks

 
 
Tributaries of the Ottawa River (from east to west):

Becketts Creek
Cardinal Creek
Taylor Creek
Bilberry Creek
Green's Creek
Mud Creek
Borthwick Creek
Nicolet Drain
Ramsay Creek
McEwan Creek
Rideau River
Rideau Canal (artificial)
Brown's Inlet
Patterson Creek
Graham Creek
Still Water Creek
Watts Creek
Shirley's Brook
Constance Creek
Carp River
Mississippi River
Cartwrights Creek
Cody Creek
Madawaska River (mouth not in Ottawa)

Tributaries of the Rideau River (from north to south):

Sawmill Creek
Nepean Creek
Black Rapids Creek
Mosquito Creek
Jock River
Mahoney Creek
Nichols Creek
Kings Creek
Mud Creek
Stevens Creek
Cranberry Creek
McDermot Drain (mouth not in Ottawa)
Brassills Creek
Rideau Creek

Other rivers and creeks within City of Ottawa:
Bear Brook
South Indian Creek
Shaws Creek
McKinnons Creek
North Castor River
Black Creek
Middle Castor River
South Castor River

Features of the Ottawa River
 

(from east to west)

Features of the Rideau River

(from north to south)

Waterfalls
Chaudière Falls
Hog's Back Falls
Princess Louise Falls
Rideau Falls

Lakes

Brewer Park Pond
Constance Lake
Lac des Chats
Dow's Lake
Lac Deschênes
Lake Madawaska
McKay Lake
Mud Lake
Mud Pond
Sand Pits Lake

References

External links
Take a Virtual Cruise on the Ottawa River